Your Turn, Callaghan (French: À toi de jouer... Callaghan) is a 1955 French thriller film directed by Willy Rozier and starring Tony Wright, Tony Wright, Lysiane Rey and Colette Ripert. It is an adaptation of the 1942 novel Sorry You've Been Troubled by British writer Peter Cheyney featuring the private detective Slim Callaghan. It was the first in a trilogy of films featuring English actor Wright as Callaghan, followed by More Whiskey for Callaghan.

Synopsis
After a ship sinks with its cargo, an insurance claim is made by the owners. Callaghan is hired by the insurance company to find out whether the accident was genuine or deliberate.

Cast
 Tony Wright as Slim Callaghan
 Lysiane Rey as Dolorès
 Colette Ripert as Manon Gardel
 Paul Cambo as Nicky Storata
 Robert Berri as Raoul de Bois-Joli dit le Vicomte
 Yorick Royan as Denise Gardel
 Roger Blin as Wladimir
 Martine Alexis as Ketty
 Raymond Cordy as Le portier
 Paul Demange as Le barman
 Maurice Bénard as Boutillon
 Robert Burnier as Nicholls
 Henri Arius as Le commissaire Merlin 
 Gil Delamare as Léon

References

Bibliography 
 Goble, Alan. The Complete Index to Literary Sources in Film. Walter de Gruyter, 1999.
 Rège, Philippe. Encyclopedia of French Film Directors, Volume 1. Scarecrow Press, 2009.

External links 
 

1955 films
1950s crime thriller films
French crime thriller films
1950s French-language films
Films directed by Willy Rozier
Films based on British novels
French black-and-white films
1950s French films

fr:À toi de jouer, Callaghan